Chah Darreh (also Romanized as Chāh Darreh; also known as Chāy Darreh and Chāy Darreh-e Qal‘eh-ye Now) is a village in Tabadkan Rural District, in the Central District of Mashhad County, Razavi Khorasan Province, Iran. At the 2006 census, its population was 394, in 110 families.

References 

Populated places in Mashhad County